Prakashbapu Vasantdada Patil (21 June 1947 – 21 October 2005) was a member of the 14th Lok Sabha of India. He represented the Sangli constituency of Maharashtra and was a member of the Indian National Congress (INC) political party.

He was member of 8th, 9th, 10th, 13th and 14th Lok Sabha from Sangli.
He died in October 2005. He was survived by his wife (Shailaja Patil), and their son Pratik Patil who won the by-poll occasioned by his father's death. After pratik patil has announced his retirement from the politics his elder brother and 2nd child of PrakashBapu Patil vishal patil has been candidate from the swabhimani shetakari party and he is defined by bjp candidate.

External links
 Official biographical sketch in Parliament of India website

 
 

1947 births
Living people
Indian National Congress politicians
People from Maharashtra
India MPs 1984–1989
India MPs 1989–1991
India MPs 1991–1996
India MPs 1999–2004
India MPs 2004–2009
Lok Sabha members from Maharashtra
Marathi politicians
Indian National Congress politicians from Maharashtra